The Lower Dharmaram Formation is a sedimentary rock formation found in Andhra Pradesh, India. It is one of the formations of the Pranhita–Godavari Basin. It is of latest Norian and Rhaetian ages (Upper Triassic), and is notable for its fossils of early dinosaurs.

Vertebrate fauna 
cf. Paratypothorax, cf. Nicrosaurus, fragmentary remains of sauropodomorphs (ISI R279, 280, 281) and neotheropods (ISI R283) have also been recovered from it.

Correlations 
The formation has been correlated with the Lower Elliot Formation (Karoo Basin) and Forest Sandstone of Africa, the Caturrita Formation of the Paraná Basin in Brazil, the Laguna Colorada and Los Colorados Formations (Ischigualasto-Villa Unión Basin) of Argentina, the Chinle Formation of North America, the Trössingen Formation of the Keuper Group of Germany, and the Nam Phong Formation of Thailand.

See also 

 List of dinosaur-bearing rock formations

References

Bibliography

Further reading 
 

Geologic formations of India
Triassic System of Asia
Norian Stage
Rhaetian Stage
Fossiliferous stratigraphic units of Asia
Paleontology in India
Geology of Andhra Pradesh